HNLMS K XI was the first of three s of the Royal Netherlands Navy, built to serve as a patrol vessel in the Dutch colonies.

Ship history
K XI was built by the Fijenoord shipyard at Rotterdam. During the tour the ships visited ports in Lithuania, Latvia, Estonia and Finland.

Finally, on 15 October 1925, K XI, under the command of First Lieutenant G.E.V.L. Beckman, departed for the Dutch East Indies. During the first part of the voyage to Tunis, Prof. Dr. F.A. Vening Meinesz was on board in order to conduct gravity measurements. On 28 December 1925 K XI arrived in Sabang.

World War II
From the German attack on the Netherlands in 1940 until the moment Japan declared war, K XI operated out of Surabaya. From 8 December 1941 to 23 January 1942, K XI fell under British operational command and conducted patrols east of Malaya.

From 23 January 1942 until the fall of Dutch East Indies in March 1942 K XI was in maintenance. During this time the ship conducted only one patrol west of Sumatra. Because of the fall of the Dutch East Indies, K XI fled to Colombo. During the voyage to Colombo, K XI picked up survivors from the sloop , depot ship Anking and Dutch ship Parigi, attacked and sunk by a Japanese fleet.

In Colombo K XI was under British operational command. The ship was used as a target ship by the Royal Navy and the Royal Indian Navy for ASW and ASDIC exercises. At the request of the Royal Navy K XI was transferred to Fremantle, Australia, on 20 February 1945, arriving on 22 March. K XI was decommissioned in early April 1945.

Fate
K XI was towed to HMAS Leeuwin III (Royal Freshwater Bay Yacht Club) where she was partially stripped and the deck gun was donated as a memento to the Yacht Club. K XI was then handed over to the Royal Australian Navy in Fremantle for transmission to the Australian Disposal Committee. Towed down river at North Quay it sank after a valve was left open. The submarine was salvaged six weeks later, K XI was stripped further before being towed out to the "Ships Graveyard" site west of Rottnest Island and scuttled in September 1946.

References
Notes

Bibliography

 

1924 ships
Ships built in Schiedam
K XI-class submarines
World War II submarines of the Netherlands